The Almirante Lynch class were a group of destroyers built for the Chilean Navy prior to World War I. Initially six ships were planned, two being delivered. Following the war, the three surviving ships were returned to the Chilean Navy and renamed the Almirante Williams class. The class of ships was named after Admiral Patricio Lynch, Chilean sailor, hero of the War of the Pacific.

Design
The Chileans had long been customers of British shipyards and ordered six ships from J. Samuel White in 1911. These destroyers were a private design by J. Samuel White that were significantly larger and heavier armed than their contemporary British destroyers. They had four funnels, a tall, narrow fore funnel and three broad, short funnels behind.

Construction of these ships led to an expansion of the yard and the purchase of a large 80 ton hammerhead crane from Babcock & Wilcox of Renfrew, Scotland.

They were initially armed with six single QF 4 inch guns, unusually arranged with four on the forecastle - two sided in front of the wheelhouse and two sided abreast it - the remaining pair being sided on the quarterdeck. These guns were of a novel Elswick design for the Chileans and when the ships were rearmed they were replaced with standard Royal Navy models. As rearmed in 1918 they carried a BL 4.7 inch gun on the forecastle and another on a bandstand between the after pair of funnels, retained the pair of 4 inch guns abreast the wheelhouse and had two QF 2 pounder pom-poms.

Service history
Only two ships were delivered before the outbreak of war and served in the Chilean Navy until 1945. The remaining four ships were purchased by the British in 1914 and fought in the Royal Navy during World War I as the Faulknor-class flotilla leaders. The three surviving ships were returned to the friendly nation of Chile in 1920, and formed the Almirante Williams class - taking their name from the original name of HMS Botha - but being worn out were scrapped in 1933.

Ships

General characteristics

Armament
 6 ×  guns (ex British ships had 2 ×  and 2 × 4 inch guns)
4 × machine guns (2 × pom-poms in ex-British ships)
6 ×  torpedo tubes (4 in ex-British ships)

References

 

Destroyer classes
 
Chile–United Kingdom relations